Cacciatore: The Hunter is an Italian television series based on the autobiographical book Cacciatore di mafiosi by magistrate Alfonso Sabella. It originally aired on Rai 2 in March 2018.

Background
Alfonso Sabella was a longtime investigating magistrate in Palermo, for the anti-mafia task force led by Giancarlo Caselli. Having captured Leoluca Bagarella and Giovanni Brusca and visited the locations where these criminal mobsters had savagely tortured and killed their victims, Sabella interviewed major and minor informants, collecting a mass of stories detailing violence, wiretapping, and street ambushes. Investigating and capturing criminal fugitives, who had sometimes hid for many years in Sicilian territory, which was at the time beyond the control of the Italian government, was a task beset with great difficulties. Sabella's book recounts the crimes and eventual capture of Mafia bosses like Bagarella, Brusca, and Pasquale Cuntrera—infamous for directing the massacres of the summer of 1993 and the 1992 assassinations of dedicated anti-Mafia prosecutors Giovanni Falcone and Paolo Borsellino—as well as the capture of the mafiosi Toto Riina and Bernardo Provenzano.

See also
 List of Italian television series

References

External links
 

Italian television series
Sicilian Mafia
1992 murders in Italy